Ian P. Griffin  (born 1966) is a New Zealand astronomer, discoverer of minor planets and a public spokesman upon scientific matters. He is currently the Director of Otago Museum, Dunedin, New Zealand. Griffin was the CEO of Science Oxford, in Oxford, United Kingdom, and the former head of public outreach at NASA's Space Telescope Science Institute.

Biographical information 

Griffin began his professional life at University College London where he decided to pursue a career combining both astronomical research and public outreach. He was director of the Armagh Planetarium from 1990 to 1995. He then worked at Astronaut Memorial Planetarium and Observatory at Brevard Community College in Cocoa, Florida and Auckland Observatory in New Zealand before accepting the position as head of public outreach at the Space Telescope Science Institute in Baltimore, US.

From 2004 to 2007 Griffin was director of the Museum of Science and Industry in Manchester.

Griffin studied and trained to be an astronomer. He obtained his PhD in astronomy from University College London, in 1991.

Griffin has a strong Twitter presence and regularly updates followers with photos of the Aurora Australis and of other astronomical phenomena.

Significant achievements 
 

In his time at Space Telescope, Griffin contributed to the observation and study of a scientifically significant binary asteroid system, known as 1998 WW31. This was only the second such binary system discovered in the Kuiper belt (the other being the Pluto and Charon system) and provided valuable data helping astronomers understand the mass and behaviour of objects in the Kuiper belt.

Via search programmes using small telescopes, Griffin also discovered 26 numbered minor planets between 1998 and 2001. Three of his discoveries were made in collaboration with Australian astronomer Nigel Brady. His discovery include: 
 10924 Mariagriffin, named after his wife Maria (b. 1962)
 23990 Springsteen, named after American musician Bruce Springsteen
 33179 Arsènewenger, named after Arsène Wenger, the former manager of Griffin's favourite football team, Arsenal

However the Mars-crossing asteroid 4995 Griffin is unrelated to him, as it was named after Griffin Swanson the son of its discoverer Steven Roger Swanson.

In 2015, Griffin was awarded the New Zealand Prime Minister's Science Communication Prize, worth NZD 100,000, for his work at Otago Museum. He was elected a Companion of Royal Society Te Apārangi in 2019.

References 
 

21st-century New Zealand astronomers
Alumni of University College London
20th-century British astronomers
Discoverers of minor planets

Living people
People associated with Otago Museum
1966 births
Companions of the Royal Society of New Zealand